Meydan Jiq (also Romanized as Meydān Jīq and Meydānjīq) is a village in Gavdul-e Markazi Rural District, in the Central District of Malekan County, East Azerbaijan Province, Iran. At the 2006 census, its population was 1,993, in 482 families.

References 

Populated places in Malekan County